Shailesh Shah (Born 31 December 1956 in Nadiad ,Gujarat) is an Indian film producer primarily associated with Gujarati cinema in addition to Hindi cinema.

Early life and education 
Shailesh Shah was born as Shaileshbhai Ranchhodbhai Shah in 1956 in a middle-class family. He completed his higher schooling from Dharm Singh Desai Technical High School in Nadiad and his senior secondary school from Ahmedabad. He earned a double degree in Political science from Bangalore University. His father was a worker in a factory, and while studying, he worked in a factory during holidays to support his family.

Career 
He started his career working in a GSFC internship and then joined the Education Ministry department, where he became a PA to the Education Minister in Gandhinagar, Gujarat for 15 years. Later, he began planning for business, and a friend suggested he start in the film industry. He produced his first Gujarati album in Gujarat, but it only sold two copies out of 5000 CDs. Afterwards, his friend took all the CDs and sold them in America.

Filmography

References

External links 
  
 Shailesh Shah at Facebook
 Shailesh Shah at Instagram
 Shailesh Shah at Twitter

Gujarati film producers
producers
producers
Indian film producers
1956 births
Living people